Velykyi Bereznyi is an urban-type settlement in Zakarpattia Oblast (province), Uzhhorod Raion, in western part of Ukraine. The settlement was also formerly the administrative center of Velykyi Bereznyi Raion, housing the district's local administration buildings until the raion's abolition, and is now administered within Uzhhorod Raion. The settlement's population was 6,655 as of the 2001 Ukrainian Census and 7,078 in 2011. Current population: .

History 
The first mention of the settlement, named after the birch tree (bereza or береза - in Ukrainian), dates back to 1409, when the kenez (headman) Boncha prosecuted the culprit for some crime and a trial was held over him. In the state tax list for 1427, it is said that Velikiy Berezny belongs to the possessions of the Uzhhorod Dominion of the Counts of Druget. According to the urbar of 1691, the current district (the center and surrounding villages) was part of the 4th district of the Uzhhorod Dominion of Count Bercheny, the heir of the Drugets, as a district.

As of 1427, there were 33 peasant yards, that is, approximately 150 souls. According to the urban census of 1791, there were 80 serf families with allotments and 70 landless residents in the village.

Residents of Velykyi Bereznyi region took an active part in the liberation war of 1703-1711. In September 1703, rebel units under the leadership of Ivan Betsa, who came down from the mountains, besieged the Uzhhorod fortress.

According to the Geographical Dictionary of Hungary, as of 1839, 1,216 people lived in Velykyi Bereznyi, of which 750 were Ukrainian Greek Catholics, 300 Roman Catholics, i.e. Hungarians and Germans, and 160 Jews.

From December 22, 2019, Velykyi Bereznyi became the center of the formed Velykyi Bereznyi Hromada, which included the following settlements —  Velykyi Bereznyi, Roztoka Pastil, Kosteva Patil, Begendiat Pastil, Rus'kyi Mochar.

References

Gallery

Urban-type settlements in Uzhhorod Raion
Populated places established in the 1400s